Balandino is a rural locality (a village) in Fominskoye Rural Settlement, Gorokhovetsky District, Vladimir Oblast, Russia. The population was 16 as of 2010.

Geography 
Balandino is located 48 km southwest of Gorokhovets (the district's administrative centre) by road. Zimenki is the nearest rural locality.

References 

Rural localities in Gorokhovetsky District